George Faber may refer to:
George Denison Faber, 1st Baron Wittenham (1852–1931), British peer
George Stanley Faber (1773–1854), English theologist
George S. J. Faber, co-founder of British production company Company Pictures
George Henry Faber, British Member of Parliament for Boston, 1906–1910